The Sahara Conference of the 2022 BAL season began on 5 March 2022 and ended on 15 March 2022. In a group of six teams, all team played each other one time. The top four teams in the standings advanced to the 2022 BAL Playoffs.

All games were played in the Dakar Arena in Dakar, Senegal.

Standings

Games
All times are in Greenwich Mean Time (GMT).

5 March 
In the opening game of the season, SLAC pulled away after the first half behind Chris Crawford who lead his team with 30 points.

6 March

8 March

9 March 
REG's Wilson Nshobozwabyosenumukiza scored a buzzer-beating three point field goal to give his team the edge over SLAC.

11 March 
US Monastir won the "Derby of the North", while Terrell Stoglin broke the record for most point in a BAL game with 41 points. The previous record was also set by him, when he scored 40 points on 20 May 2021 in the 2021 season.

12 March

14 March

15 March

References

Sahara Conference
BAL Sahara Conference
BAL
Sports competitions in Dakar